Hans Peter Minderhoud (born 7 October 1973 in Westkapelle, Zeeland) is a Dutch dressage rider.

Minderhoud won the VSN Cup in 2004 with his horse Gameboy and also succeeded in the Pavo Cup with Sandreo and Florencio. At the 2004 World Championships for 5-year-old horses, he won the World title in Verden with Florencio. In the 2004/05 Stallion Competition he won the L-Class with Sandreo and the Z-Class with Rhodium. He won his second World title at the 2005 World Championships for 6-year-old horses with Florencio. Later that year he and Uptown won the Pavo Cup as well.

In the 2005/06 Stallion Competition he retained his titles in the L and Z-Class, and also added the M-Class to his list. With Rubels he won the 2006 VHO Trophy. Besides that he succeeded in the Future Stallion Tournament with Florencio and the Pavo Cup with Ucelli T. In the 2007 Future Stallion Tournament he retained his title with Ucelli T, but also won the silver medal with EXQUIS Rubiloh in the same event. He succeeded again at the Pavo Cup, this time with Vivaldi. At the 2007 European Championships in Turin he and his teammates became European Champion in the team competition.

With Johnson he won the KWPN Stallion Championship 2007/08 and he also qualified for the 2008 Summer Olympics in Beijing. He qualified for the individual competition as well as the team event with his teammates Anky van Grunsven and Imke Bartels. In personal life, Minderhoud has a relationship with teammate Edward Gal.

He also competed at the 2015 European Dressage Championships in Aachen where he won a gold medal in team dressage. The Dutch national dressage coach Wim Ernes died on 1 November 2016 due to a brain tumor. Minderhoud, together with the other gold medal winners Patrick van der Meer, Edward Gal, and Diederik van Silfhout, carried his coffin during the funeral on 5 November 2016.

Notable Horses 

 Exquis Nadine - 1995 Chestnut Dutch Warmblood Mare (TCN Partout x Roemer)
 2007 European Championships - Team Gold Medal, Individual 14th Place
 2008 Beijing Olympics - Team Silver Medal, Individual Fifth Place
 2009 FEI World Cup Final - Fourth Place
 2010 World Equestrian Games - Team Gold Medal, Individual 22nd Place
 2011 FEI World Cup Final - Eighth Place
 2011 European Championships - Team Bronze Medal, Individual 14th Place, Individual 11th Place Freestyle
 Glock's Tango - 2000 Chestnut Dutch Warmblood Stallion (Jazz x Contango)
 2012 FEI World Cup Final - Sixth Place
 Glock's Romanov - 2000 Bay Oldenburg Stallion (Rohdiamant x Grundstein II)
 2013 European Championships - Team Silver Medal, Individual 13th Place
 Glock's Johnson TN - 2002 Bay Dutch Warmblood Stallion (Jazz x Flemmingh)
 2014 FEI World Cup Final - Eighth Place
 2014 World Equestrian Games - Team Bronze Medal, Individual 11th Place, Individual 14th Place Freestyle
 2015 European Championships - Team Gold Medal, Individual Bronze Medal, Individual Fifth Place Freestyle
 2016 Rio Olympics - Team Fourth Place, Individual Ninth Place
 Glock's Flirt - 2001 Chestnut Swiss Warmblood Stallion (Florestan I x Gauguin de Lully)
 2015 FEI World Cup Final - Fifth Place
 2016 FEI World Cup Final - Gold Medal
 Glock's Dream Boy - 2008 Black Dutch Warmblood Stallion (Vivaldi x Olympic Ferro)
 2018 World Equestrian Games - Team Fourth lace, Individual 20th Place
 2019 FEI World Cup Final - Tenth Place
 2019 European Championships - Team Silver Medal, Individual Thirteenth Place, Individual Ninth Place Freestyle
 2021 Tokyo Olympics - Team Fifth Place, Individual Twelfth Place
 2021 European Championships - Team Fifth Place, Individual Sixteenth Place

External links
Official homepage

References

1973 births
Living people
Dutch dressage riders
Equestrians at the 2008 Summer Olympics
Equestrians at the 2016 Summer Olympics
Equestrians at the 2020 Summer Olympics
Gay sportsmen
LGBT equestrians
Dutch LGBT sportspeople
Olympic equestrians of the Netherlands
Dutch male equestrians
Olympic medalists in equestrian
Olympic silver medalists for the Netherlands
People from Veere
Medalists at the 2008 Summer Olympics
21st-century Dutch people